The striolated bunting (Emberiza striolata) is a passerine bird in the bunting family Emberizidae, a group now separated by most modern authors from the finches, Fringillidae.

Distribution and habitat 
It is a resident breeder of dry country from Chad, east through south-west Asia to north-western India  and in Africa.

It breeds in remote wadis (not around human habitation like the related house bunting), usually close to streams, laying two to four eggs in a nest on the ground or in a hole in the ground. Its natural food consists of seeds, or when feeding young, insects.

Description 
It is 14 cm long, similar in size to the house bunting and smaller than the similarly plumaged rock bunting. The breeding male has a chestnut body, and grey head with darker streaking and a white supercilium and moustachial streak. The female's head has a brown tint to the grey, and more diffused streaking.

The striolated bunting has stronger facial striping and a paler belly than the north African house bunting, which used to be considered conspecific as the subspecies E. striolata sahari. Birds in eastern Chad (E. striolata jebelmarrae) show some evidence of intergradation with the house bunting.

The song, given from a perch, is similar to but weaker than that of the common chaffinch.

Subspecies
Emberiza striolata striolata Northeast Africa to Arabia, Iran, Pakistan and central India
Emberiza striolata saturatior Highlands of central Sudan, Ethiopia and Kenya
Emberiza striolata jebelmarrae Highlands of Sudan (Jebel Marra)
Emberiza striolata sahari Morocco east to  Libya, south to Senegal, Mali, Niger and Chad

Behaviour

Breeding 
The breeding range of the bird in India has been noted in recent times to include more southerly locations such as near Saswad near Pune. The incubation period of the clutch of three eggs is 14 days.

References

striolated bunting
Birds of East Africa
Birds of the Middle East
Birds of Pakistan
striolated bunting